Cairo Township is an inactive township in Randolph County, in the U.S. state of Missouri.

Cairo Township takes its name from the community of Cairo, Missouri.

References

Townships in Missouri
Townships in Randolph County, Missouri